Olivier Irabaruta (born 25 August 1990) is a Burundian long-distance runner. At the 2012 Summer Olympics, he competed in the Men's 5000 metres, finishing 29th overall in Round 1, failing to qualify for the final.

At the 2016 Summer Olympics, he competed in the 5000 metres and the 10,000 metres. He finished 27th overall in round 1 of the 5000 m competition and did not qualify for the finals. He finished 27th in the 10,000m competition. Irabaruta was the flag bearer for Burundi during the Parade of Nations.

He represented his country at the IAAF World Cross Country Championships in 2009 as a junior runner and 2015, 2017, and 2019 as a senior athlete.

In 2019, he competed in the men's marathon at the 2019 World Athletics Championships held in Doha, Qatar. He did not finish his race.

He represented Burundi at the 2020 Summer Olympics in the men's marathon.

References

1990 births
Living people
People from Muramvya Province
Burundian male long-distance runners
Burundian male cross country runners
Olympic athletes of Burundi
Athletes (track and field) at the 2012 Summer Olympics
Athletes (track and field) at the 2016 Summer Olympics
Athletes (track and field) at the 2020 Summer Olympics
20th-century Burundian people
21st-century Burundian people